The 49th Directors Guild of America Awards, honoring the outstanding directorial achievements in films, documentary and television in 1996, were presented on March 8, 1997 at the Hyatt Regency Century Plaza and the Sheraton New York Hotel. The simultaneous ceremonies were hosted by Carl Reiner in Los Angeles and Mary Tyler Moore in New York. The nominees in the feature film category were announced on January 21, 1997 and the other nominations were announced starting on February 4, 1997.

Winners and nominees

Film

Television

Commercials

D.W. Griffith Award
 Stanley Kubrick

Lifetime Achievement in Sports Direction
 Larry Kamm

Lifetime Achievement in News Direction
 Max A. Schindler

Robert B. Aldrich Service Award
 Delbert Mann

Franklin J. Schaffner Achievement Award
 Joseph Dicso

Diversity Award
 Christopher Chulack
 Bruce Paltrow
 John Wells

References

External links
 

Directors Guild of America Awards
1996 film awards
1996 television awards
1996 in American cinema
1996 in American television
Directors
1997 in Los Angeles
1997 in New York City
March 1997 events in the United States